The Champaran Satyagrah Express is an Express train belonging to Northern Railway zone that runs between  and  in India. It is currently being operated with 14009/14010 train numbers on a weekly basis.

Service

The 14009/Champaran Satyagrah Express has an average speed of 47 km/hr and covers 964 km in 20h 40m. The 14010/Champaran Satyagrah Express has an average speed of 48 km/hr and covers 964 km in 20h 15m.

Route and halts 

The important halts of the train are:

Coach composition

The train has LHB rakes with max speed of 160 kmph. The train consists of 16 coaches:

 1 AC III Tier
 7 Sleeper coaches
 6 General
 2 Seating cum Luggage Rake

Traction

Both trains are hauled by a Ghaziabad Loco Shed-based WAP-4 electric locomotive from Motihari to Delhi and vice versa.

Rake sharing

The train shares its rake with 12444/12443 Haldia–Anand Vihar Terminal Superfast Express.

See also 

 Bapudham Motihari railway station
 Anand Vihar Terminal railway station
 Satyagrah Express
 Haldia–Anand Vihar Terminal Superfast Express

Notes

References

External links 

 14009/Champaran Satyagrah Express
 14010/Champaran Satyagrah Express

Transport in Delhi
Named passenger trains of India
Rail transport in Delhi
Rail transport in Bihar
Rail transport in Uttar Pradesh
Railway services introduced in 2016